Maria Bondarenko (born 9 April 2003) is a Russian tennis player.

Bondarenko has a career-high singles ranking by the WTA of 379, achieved on 11 July 2022. She also has a career-high WTA doubles ranking of world No. 283, achieved on 25 July 2022. She has won one doubles title on the ITF Women's World Tennis Tour.

Bondarenko won her biggest tournament to date at the 2022 Open Araba en Femenino in Vitoria-Gasteiz, Spain, where she partnered with Ioana Loredana Roșca to win the doubles title.

Junior career

Grand Slam performance
Singles:

 Australian Open: 2R (2020)
 French Open: 2R (2021)
 Wimbledon: –
 US Open: –

Doubles:

 Australian Open: 1R (2020)
 French Open: F (2020, 2021)
 Wimbledon: –
 US Open: –

ITF Circuit finals

Singles: 2 (2 runner-ups)

Doubles: 4 (1 title, 3 runner-ups)

Junior Grand Slam finals

Doubles: 2 (2 runner-ups)

References

External links
 
 

2003 births
Living people
Russian female tennis players
21st-century Russian women